The 1991–92 A Group was the 44th season of the A Football Group, the top Bulgarian professional league for association football clubs, since its establishment in 1948.

Overview
It was contested by 16 teams, and CSKA Sofia won the championship.

Dunav Ruse and Haskovo were relegated at the end of the last season. They were replaced by two teams from the B Group, Dobrudzha and Hebar.

League standings

Results

Champions
CSKA Sofia

Parushev, Nachov, E. Dimitrov, Pavlov, Marinov and Pramatarov left the club during the season.

Top scorers

Source:1991–92 Top Goalscorers

References
Bulgaria - List of final tables (RSSSF)

First Professional Football League (Bulgaria) seasons
Bulgaria
1